Chaleh-ye Faramarzan (also Romanized as Chāleh-ye Farāmarzān) is a village in Jenah Rural District, Jenah District, Bastak County, Hormozgan Province, Iran. At the 2006 census, its population was 283, in 61 families.

References 

Populated places in Bastak County